Kampung Desa Serdang is a small village in Serdang, Selangor, Malaysia. This village can be seen from the Sungai Besi Expressway and North–South Expressway Southern Route.

Villages in Selangor